Fort Stockton High School is a public high school located in Fort Stockton, Texas, USA, and classified as a 4A school by the University Interscholastic League.  It is part of the Fort Stockton Independent School District located in west-central Pecos County.  In 2015, the school was rated "Met Standard" by the Texas Education Agency.

Athletics
The Fort Stockton Panthers compete in cross-country, volleyball, football, basketball, powerlifting, swimming, diving, golf, tennis, track, softball, and baseball.

State titles have been won in boys' golf (1977 - 3A), girls' golf (1977 - 3A), and  boys' track (1955 - 1A, 1962 - 2A).

Notable people

Notable alumni
 Rick McIvor – collegiate and professional (NFL) American football player: St. Louis Cardinals (1982–1983)
 Tate Randle – collegiate and NFL player: Houston Oilers, Baltimore / Indianapolis Colts, Miami Dolphins (1982–1987)
 George Shirkey – collegiate and professional NFL player: Houston Oilers and Oakland Raiders (1960–1962)

Notable staff
 Doug Davalos – former Fort Stockton High School basketball coach (1996–2000), collegiate basketball coach: Texas State University (2006–2013)

References

External links
 
 Fort Stockton ISD

Public high schools in Texas
Fort Stockton, Texas
Schools in Pecos County, Texas